Golden Gate Fields is an American horse racing track straddling both Albany, California and Berkeley, California along the shoreline of the San Francisco Bay adjacent to the Eastshore Freeway in the San Francisco Bay Area. With the closing of the Bay Meadows racetrack on May 11, 2008, it became the only major Thoroughbred racetrack in Northern California. It is currently owned by The Stronach Group.

Golden Gate Fields' facilities currently include a one-mile (1,609 m) synthetic track and a turf course measuring 9/10 of a mile, or 7 furlongs plus 132 feet (1,448 m), stalls for 1,420 horses, a main grandstand with seating for about 8,000 customers, a clubhouse with seating for about 5,200 customers, a Turf Club with seating for about 1,500 customers and parking for over 8,500 cars. The synthetic track is called Tapeta and was installed in the summer of 2007.

History 
Golden Gate Fields racetrack is situated on a tract of land bordered on the west by Fleming Point, a rocky promontory which lies on the eastern shoreline of San Francisco Bay. On the north, it is bordered by the Albany Bulb, Albany Beach and Albany Plateau, undeveloped terrain over a former landfill, owned by the City of Albany. To the east is Interstate 80 and to the south, the Berkeley Meadow. This tract lies on what was once a part of the slough into which three creeks drain: Schoolhouse Creek, Codornices Creek and Marin Creek. The tract had originally been that portion of the Rancho San Antonio owned by José Domingo Peralta.  He sold it in July 1852 to John Fleming, who used it as a transhipment point for sending his cattle across the bay to San Francisco for slaughter and processing.  Later in the 19th century, it was the site of the Giant Powder Company, a manufacturer of dynamite and nitroglycerin.  Between 1879 and 1892, the plant blew up twice.

Competitive horse racing in this part of the East Bay originated with the Oakland Trotting Track about 2 miles south of the site of Golden Gate Fields, in what is now  Emeryville.  The Oakland Trotting Track was open from 1871 until it was forced to close in 1911 when the state banned horse racing.  A fire in 1915 destroyed what remained of its structures.  In 1933, the state repealed the ban on horse racing.

Just before World War II, Golden Gate Fields built its new grandstand up against the eastern slope of Fleming Point, and adjacent marshland was filled in for the track.  The inaugural meet was on February 1, 1941.  In the period just before the war, the track was used as the scene of the crime central to the plot of the movie Shadow of the Thin Man.

With the onset of World War II, the United States Navy took over the property as the Naval Landing Force Equipment Depot, Albany for storing hundreds of landing craft destined for use in the Pacific theater.  After the war, Golden Gate Fields resumed horse racing.

Golden Gate Fields was owned and managed for 25 years by San Francisco foreign car importer and horseman Kjell Qvale.  In 1989, Golden Gate Fields was acquired by UK-based Ladbroke Racing. It was later acquired in 1999 by Magna Entertainment Corp., as Ladbroke wanted to divest of its non-European holdings. In March 2009, Magna filed for bankruptcy. The Stronach Group, the current owners, acquired Golden Gate Fields on July 3, 2011.

Golden Gate Fields made history in 2016 when it hired 29-year-old Angela Hermann as its track announcer, succeeding Michael Wrona. Hermann was the first full-time female race caller in the United States since Ann Elliott worked in the 1960s at Jefferson Downs near New Orleans.  

Currently 28-year-old Matt Dinerman is the race announcer and track handicapper at Golden Gate Fields.

Racing

In 1950, Citation and Noor met in the Golden Gate Handicap. The English bred Noor beat the great Triple Crown winner Citation, prompting Citation's rider, Steve Brooks, to say, "We just can't beat that horse."

In 1957, the horse Silky Sullivan came to the track and with him came the excitement that followed him throughout his life. Until the death of Lost in the Fog, he was also the only horse to be buried in the infield.  Lost in the Fog's plaque is the third to be placed at Golden Gate Fields, found near the one for Silky Sullivan and that for Bill Shoemaker.

The infield turf course was opened on February 22, 1972.

In 1974, the first $2 million day in Northern California was held on California Derby Day.

In 1984, the great gelding John Henry set a course record winning the Golden Gate Handicap.

Before his death in 2006, Lost in the Fog was based here.  On September 17, 2006, he was euthanized due to inoperable tumors found on his spleen and along his spine.  Prior to his early death, Lost in the Fog ran three races at his home base — winning twice, and placing once.  On September 30, 2006 Golden Gate Fields held a celebration of his life.

During the summer of 2007, the racetrack installed a polymer synthetic type racing surface as mandated by the California Horse Racing Board.  The Tapeta Footings synthetic all-weather racing surface is designed to make racing safer for both horses and riders.

On February 1, 2008, on board the horse Two Step Cat, Russell Baze got his 10,000th career win as a jockey. Baze won 54 riding titles and a total of 5,765 races at Golden Gate Fields during his career.

Shared Belief, the Champion 2-year-old colt of 2013, was based at the track and won several races there.

With the loss of Bay Meadows to developers in 2008, Golden Gate Fields has become Northern California's only major racetrack (aside from the racetracks associated with the summer fair circuit). The California Horse Racing Board (CHRB) sets the specific racing dates each year, but there is customarily a long winter/spring meet running from late December to mid June, and a fall meet running from mid October to mid December. Starting in 2010, a summer meet was added with dates based around the summer fair circuit. On June 15, 2016, the CHRB presented a proposed 2017 calendar that would eliminate the summer meet.

Transportation
AC Transit, the local public transit agency, provided a seasonal bus service, line 304, between the track and North Berkeley BART station until 2008.  The track is also accessible from the Gilman Street and Albany exits of the Eastshore Freeway, as well as from adjacent city streets.  The San Francisco Bay Trail, a bicycle and walking path passes between the bay and the stands. In 2009 East Shore Charter Lines was contracted to provide the racetrack with a new free service from the BART station.

Racing events
The following Graded events were held at Golden Gate Fields in 2020.

Grade III 
 
 Berkeley Handicap
 San Francisco Mile Stakes
 
The following are black type listed stakes:

 El Camino Real Derby
 California Derby
 All American Stakes

It hosts numerous overnight handicaps and ungraded stakes events.

 California Oaks
 Silky Sullivan Handicap 
 Albany Stakes 
 Alcatraz Stakes
 Campanile Stakes
 Golden Poppy
 Tanforan Stakes, 3 Year Olds and up, one mile and 3/8, turf.  $75,000
 Miss America Stakes, Fillies and mares, 3 Year Olds and up, one mile and 1/8, turf.  $75,000
 Corte Madera Stakes, 2 Year Old Fillies, one mile.  $75,000
 China Basin Stakes
 Gold Rush Stakes
 Half Moon Bay Stakes
 Lost in the Fog Stakes
 Pacific Heights Stakes, 3 Year Olds and up (Cal-breds), one mile and 1/16.  $75,000
 Mill Valley Stakes
 Raise Your Skirts, 4 Year Olds and up, Fillies & Mares, 6 furlongs, $75,000.
 Tiburon Handicap, 3 Year Old Fillies, six furlongs.  $75,000
 Sausalito Stakes, 3 Year Olds and up, six furlongs.  $75,000
 Forty Niner Stakes, 3 Year Olds and up, one mile and 1/16.  $75,000
 Stinson Beach Stakes, 3 Year Olds, six furlongs.  $50,000
 Oakland Stakes, 3 Year Olds and up, six furlongs.  $75,000
 Golden Gate Fields Sprint, 4 Year Olds & Up, 6 furlongs, $75,000.
 Work the Crowd, 4 Year Olds & Up, Fillies & Mares (Cal-bred), 1 mile and 1/16, $75,000.
 Silveyville Stakes, 1 and 1/16 mile, $73,500
 Golden Nugget Stakes, $50,000

Pop culture references
 Punk rock band Rancid wrote and performed the song "GGF", about lead singer Tim Armstrong's childhood near Golden Gate Fields, on their 2000 self-titled album.
 Golden Gate Fields was featured in the Rancid video "Last One to Die".
 In On the Road by Jack Kerouac, Sal Paradise visits Golden Gate Fields with his friend Remi Boncœur who loses all their money before the seventh race.
 In the movie Metro starring Eddie Murphy and Michael Rapaport, Murphy's character is seen at Golden Gate Fields betting on a race and blaming Russell Baze for losing his money.

Notes and references
 A Selective History of the Codornices-University Village..., by Warren and Catherine Lee, Imprint (Albuquerque, N.M.): Belvidere Delaware Railroad Company Enterprises, Ltd., (2000).

External links
 Photos of Golden Gate Fields, including memorial plaque for Silky Sullivan and Lost in the Fog
 Golden Gate Fields facebook fan page
 Photo taken from the grandstand, Naval Landing Force Equipment Depot, Albany (WW 2)

 
Horse racing venues in California
Sports venues in Alameda County, California
Sports venues in Berkeley, California
Albany, California
Stronach Group
1941 establishments in California
Tourist attractions in Alameda County, California